"Itsy Bitsy Spider" (also known as "Incy Wincy Spider" in Australia,  Great Britain, New Zealand and most other English speaking Countries and several other similar-sounding names) is a popular nursery rhyme and fingerplay that describes the adventures of a spider as it ascends, descends, and reascends the downspout or "waterspout" of a gutter system (or, alternatively, the spout of a teapot or open-air reservoir). It is usually accompanied by a sequence of gestures that mimic the words of the song. Its Roud Folk Song Index number is 11586.

Throughout this article, the North American title and lyrics are used to ensure consistency.

Lyrics
A commonly used version uses these words and gestures:

Other versions exist.

Sources 
The song can be found in publications including an alternative version in the book, Camp and Camino in Lower California (1910), where it was referred to as [the classic] "Spider Song." It appears to be a different version of this song using “blooming, bloody” instead of "itsy bitsy". It was later published in one of its several modern versions in Western Folklore, by the California Folklore Society (1948), Mike and Peggy Seeger's, American Folk Songs for Children (1948).

Lyrics as described in 1910, as being from the 'classic' "Spider Song":

Oh, the blooming, bloody spider went up the spider web,
The blooming, bloody rain came down and washed the spider out,
The blooming, bloody sun came out and dried up all the rain,
And the blooming, bloody spider came up the web again.

The song is sung by and for children in countless languages and cultures. It is similar to the melodies of the children's songs "Sweetly Sings the Donkey" in the United States, and "Auf der Mauer, auf der Lauer", "Ich bin ein kleiner Esel" (the German-language version of "Sweetly Sings the Donkey") and "Spannenlanger Hansel" in German-speaking countries.

Recordings 

The popular nursery rhyme has been covered and sampled a number of times.

1980: Patsy Biscoe (as "Incy Wincy Spider") CD: 50 Favourite Nursery Rhymes Vol. 1, also available as 3-CD set 150 Favourite Nursery Rhymes
1986: Carly Simon on the Heartburn film and on the Coming Around Again album
1988: Carly Simon on the Greatest Hits Live album
1989: Nicole Kidman on the Dead Calm soundtrack (as "Incy Wincy")
1991: Little Richard on the Disney CD For Our Children, to benefit the Elizabeth Glaser Pediatric AIDS Foundation
1994: Cedarmont Kids on Toddler Tunes
1995: Danish-Norwegian pop band Aqua, then known by their original band name Joyspeed, released a single only "Itzy Bitzy Spider"
1996: Jack Hartmann on Rhymin' to the Beat
2001: Funkeymonkeys on their self-titled album
2002: The Mars Volta sampled the rhyme on their song "Eunuch Provocateur" from their extended play Tremulant
2002: Raffi sang this song on his Let's Play album by adding an additional verse
2002: Joey DeLuxe during the credits of Eight Legged Freaks
2006: EliZe feat. Jay Colin released "Itsy Bitsy Spider" on the album In Control
2013: Maziar Bahari's company Off-Centre Productions created an animated version of the song featuring an animated mouse character named "Journo"
2021: Lyn Lapid (as "Itsy Bitsy") – single

See also
 List of nursery rhymes

References

Citations

General and cited sources 
 

American children's songs
American nursery rhymes
Articles containing video clips
Carly Simon songs
Early childhood education
English children's songs
English folk songs
Finger plays
Songs about spiders
Traditional children's songs